Richard Anthony Harrison MBE FRAS FInstP is the Head of Space Physics Division and Chief Scientist at the Rutherford Appleton Laboratory in the United Kingdom.  He is best known for his magnetic twisting theory involving the coronal heating problem of the Sun's atmosphere.

He was born in Solihull, West Midlands (County) and attended Solihull Sixth Form College and Birmingham University.

Whilst in his late teens, and as a keen acoustic guitarist, he set up a band called Capella. Fellow band members were his brother, Jeremy, and David J Nutting. They performed locally and were influenced by John Denver and The Eagles, amongst others.

Richard Harrison received his B.Sc in 1979 and his Ph.D. in 1983 from the University of Birmingham, United Kingdom. He then became SER (Research Fellow at the Space Research Department, University of Birmingham, and from 1986 Scientific Officer up to grade 7 of the Astrophysics division of the Rutherford Appleton Laboratory. From 1985-1986 he was visiting Scientists at the HAO in Boulder, United States. His main interest has been solar physics research, and he was instigator of the first multi-observatory observation of coronal mass ejections, joint leader at the 81.5 MHz radio array at Cambridge, principal scientists for the first mm observations of the Sun and principal investigator of the Coronal Diagnostic Spectrometer on SOHO. Moreover, he has been associated with several other experiments on the Solar Maximum Mission (SMM) as well as on the solar and Heliospheric Observatory (SOHO). He has been author or co-author of more than 70 articles published in international journals and books.

Richard Harrison served as Editor of the Society's journal Annales Geophysicae and as General Editor for the COSPAR Information Bulletin as well as member of several committees related to the Royal Society and to ESA, COSPAR or EGS.

Richard Harrison was awarded the NCAR Outstanding Publication Prize and the NASA Group Achievement Award, and he is Fellow of the Royal Astronomical Society, Member of the International Astronomical Union and Corresponding Member of the International Academy of Astronautics.

He was awarded the MBE (Member of the Order of the British Empire) in the 2004 Queen's Birthday Honours List for his services to Solar Research.

In popular media
Harrison appeared in a Horizon (BBC TV series) TV program,  Secrets of the Star Disc, in 2004.

Harrison was also acknowledged in the credits to Wonders of the Solar System: Empire of the Sun, 2010, a BBC TV series.

References

External links
 Coronal heating problem
 A Day In The Life Of Richard Harrison
 Solar Terrestrial Relations Observatory - STEREO

British space scientists
Living people
Fellows of the Institute of Physics
Members of the Order of the British Empire
Alumni of the University of Birmingham
People from Solihull
Fellows of the Royal Astronomical Society
Year of birth missing (living people)